Kita Solar Power Station, is a  solar power plant in Mali. At the time of its commissioning, in April 2020, it was the largest, grid-connected solar power station in West Africa.

Location
The geographical coordinates of Kita Solar Power Station are: 13°01'51.0"N, 09°31'23.0"W (Latitude:13.030833; 
Longitude:-9.523056).

Overview
The power station is a joint venture between Akuo Energy, an independent energy producer, based in France, and Pash Global, an investment company. Together, they own Akuo Kita Solar, the special purpose vehicle company that owns and operates the power station. The power generated is purchased by the Malian public electric utility company, Electricité du Mali, pursuant to a 30-year power purchase agreement.

Kita Solar Power Station is capable of supplying electric energy for up to 120,000  households in Mali. In addition, it helps the country to save the emission of up to 52,000 tonnes of carbon dioxide every year.

Ownership
The table below illustrates the ownership of Kita Solar Power Station and of Akuo Kita Solar, the special purpose vehicle company that operates the power station.

Funding
The cost of construction is reported to be 53 billion CFA francs (€80.7 million). Lenders to the project included:
1. West African Development Bank 2. Emerging Africa Infrastructure Fund 3. FMO (Netherlands) 4. National Agricultural Development Bank of Mali 5. Green Africa Power and 6. GuarantCo.

See also

Fana Solar Power Station
Ségou Solar Power Station
List of power stations in Mali

References

External links
 Project Profile

2020 establishments in Mali
Renewable energy power stations in Mali
Solar power stations in Mali
Energy infrastructure completed in 2020